Actinium compounds are compounds containing the element actinium (Ac). Due to actinium's intense radioactivity, only a limited number of actinium compounds are known. These include: AcF3, AcCl3, AcBr3, AcOF, AcOCl, AcOBr, Ac2S3, Ac2O3, AcPO4 and Ac(NO3)3. Except for AcPO4, they are all similar to the corresponding lanthanum compounds. They all contain actinium in the oxidation state +3. In particular, the lattice constants of the analogous lanthanum and actinium compounds differ by only a few percent.

Properties of actinium compounds 

Here a, b and c are lattice constants, No is space group number and Z is the number of formula units per unit cell. Density was not measured directly but calculated from the lattice parameters.

Oxides 

Actinium(III) oxide is the only oxide that actinium can form, with the chemical formula Ac2O3. In this compound, actinium is in the oxidation state +3. It is similar to the corresponding lanthanum compound, lanthanum(III) oxide. It can be obtained by heating the hydroxide at 500 °C or the oxalate at 1100 °C, in vacuum. Its crystal lattice is isotypic with the oxides of most trivalent rare-earth metals.

Halides 
Actinium trifluoride can be produced either in solution or in solid reaction. The former reaction is carried out at room temperature, by adding hydrofluoric acid to a solution containing actinium ions. In the latter method, actinium metal is treated with hydrogen fluoride vapors at 700 °C in an all-platinum setup. Treating actinium trifluoride with ammonium hydroxide at 900–1000 °C yields oxyfluoride AcOF. Whereas lanthanum oxyfluoride can be easily obtained by burning lanthanum trifluoride in air at 800 °C for an hour, similar treatment of actinium trifluoride yields no AcOF and only results in melting of the initial product.

AcF3 + 2 NH3 + H2O → AcOF + 2 NH4F

Actinium trichloride is obtained by reacting actinium hydroxide or oxalate with carbon tetrachloride vapors at temperatures above 960 °C. Similar to oxyfluoride, actinium oxychloride can be prepared by hydrolyzing actinium trichloride with ammonium hydroxide at 1000 °C. However, in contrast to the oxyfluoride, the oxychloride could well be synthesized by igniting a solution of actinium trichloride in hydrochloric acid with ammonia.

Reaction of aluminium bromide and actinium oxide yields actinium tribromide:
Ac2O3 + 2 AlBr3 → 2 AcBr3 + Al2O3

and treating it with ammonium hydroxide at 500 °C results in the oxybromide AcOBr.

Other compounds 
Actinium hydride was obtained by reduction of actinium trichloride with potassium at 300 °C, and its structure was deduced by analogy with the corresponding LaH2 hydride. The source of hydrogen in the reaction was uncertain.

Mixing monosodium phosphate (NaH2PO4) with a solution of actinium in hydrochloric acid yields white-colored actinium phosphate hemihydrate (AcPO4·0.5H2O), and heating actinium oxalate with hydrogen sulfide vapors at 1400 °C for a few minutes results in a black actinium sulfide Ac2S3. It may possibly be produced by acting with a mixture of hydrogen sulfide and carbon disulfide on actinium oxide at 1000 °C.

See also 
 Thorium compounds
 Protactinium compounds

References 

Actinium compounds
Actinium
Chemical compounds by element